Mastigopterus imperator is a species of cusk-eel found in the Indian and Pacific Oceans where it occurs at depths of from .  This species grows to a length of  SL.  It is the only known member of its genus.

References
 

Ophidiidae
Monotypic fish genera
Fish described in 1913